Strictly Unconventional is a 1930 American pre-Code drama film directed by David Burton, written by Sylvia Thalberg and Frank Butler, and starring Catherine Dale Owen, Paul Cavanagh, Tyrell Davis, Lewis Stone and Ernest Torrence. It was released on May 3, 1930, by Metro-Goldwyn-Mayer. It is based upon the 1921 play The Circle by W. Somerset Maugham.

Plot
A young woman married into an aristocratic English family finds life with her husband dull and decides to elope with a Canadian. However her mother-in-law, who did something similar thirty years before, tries to prevent her.

Cast 
 Lewis Stone as Clive Champion-Cheney
 Catherine Dale Owen as Elizabeth
 Paul Cavanagh as Ted
 Ernest Torrence as Lord Porteous
 Tyrell Davis as Arnold Champion-Cheney 
 Alison Skipworth as Lady Catherine Champion-Chene
 Mary Forbes as Mrs. Anna Shenstone
 Wilfred Noy as Butler
 William H. O'Brien as Footman

References

External links 
 
 
 
 

1930 films
1930s English-language films
American drama films
1930 drama films
Metro-Goldwyn-Mayer films
Films directed by David Burton
American black-and-white films
Films set in England
Films set in London
Films based on works by W. Somerset Maugham
1930s American films